The 2009  Savannah State Tigers football team represented Savannah State University in American football. The Tigers were members of the NCAA Division I Football Championship Subdivision as an independent. This was the second season under the guidance of head coach Robby Wells.

The Tigers entered the 2009 season seeking its first winning season since joining Division I-AA in 2000, but ended the season with a 2–8 record. The team compiled a 5–7 record in 2008, the most wins since 1999, when the Tigers finished with a 5–6 as a member of the NCAA Division II. The Tigers last winning season was in 1998.

Season summary

Preseason
Former offensive coordinator and quarterback coach Alan Hall left the Savannah State staff to join the football program at Winston-Salem State University
 – Savannah State announced the signing of National Letters of Intent by 21 players.

Spring practice was held between March 24, 2009 and April 16, 2009. The annual spring game was held on April 18, 2009. During the game, the Orange beat the Blue, 23–0.
The game between Savannah State and North  Greenville, originally scheduled for October 10 at Ted Wright Stadium in Savannah, was canceled because of a scheduling  conflict.
The Tigers announced the addition of CJ Frye (running backs coach) and Hans Batichon (wide receivers coach) on July 29, 2009. Frye replaced Trevin Smith who left the Tigers' staff, while Batichon replaced Eddie Johnson who was promoted to offensive coordinator / quarterbacks coach. Frye was the offensive coordinator at McCormick High School in McCormick, South Carolina last season and played offensive line at the University of South Carolina. Batichon, a graduate of Appalachian State University (where he played wide receiver), came to SSU from Watauga High School in Boone, North Carolina.
Eighty-five players reported to campus on August 4, 2009 for Football Camp. The Tigers returned 56 lettermen, including 16 starters and 29 newcomers.  The first practice was also held on August 5.
Coach Wells announced on August 28 that senior wide receiver Deleon Hollinger, senior linebacker Antwan Allen, senior defensive lineman Brandon Miller and senior offensive lineman Derrick Dorsey were selected as team captains for the 2009 season.
Barry Casterlin is hired as running backs coach to replace Curtis Frye who left SSU to become tight ends coach at Tennessee State University.

Regular season
The Tigers win over Livingstone College on September 5 was the team's first season opening win in five years.
The Tigers loss to McNeese State on September 19, was the team's worst loss since losing to Gardner-Webb University, 66–0, on November 3, 2007 and the first shutout loss for Coach Wells.
Center Donnell Collins sustained a season-ending ankle injury in the Tigers' 47–10 loss to Charleston Southern on October 3, 2009.
Former Savannah State player Shannon Sharpe's #2 jersey, was officially retired by the university and presented to Sharpe during the pre-game ceremony before the Bethune-Cookman University game on October 17.

Schedule

Coaches and support staff

Roster
{| class="toccolours" style="border-collapse: collapse; font-size:90%;"
|-
|colspan="7" align="center"|2009 Savannah State Tigers by position 
|-
|valign="top"|

Quarterbacks
1 Kurvin Curry – Sophomore
13 Antonio Bostic – Freshman
14 A.J. Defilippis – Freshman

Running Backs
20 Justin Babb – Junior
21 Rashard Russell – Freshman
29 Rashad Curry – Junior
31 Tim Williams – Sophomore
34 Daniel Heslop – Freshman
47 Jared Pollard – Freshman

Wide Receivers
4 Deron Talley – Sophomore
5 Ricky Rivera – Freshman
6 Byron Leggett – Junior
9 Deleon Hollinger – Senior
16 Zach Mayfield – Freshman
19 Javares Taylor – Senior
24 Antonio Proctor – Freshman
80 B.J. Longley – Sophomore
81 Armond Denson – Junior
82 Stefon Taylor – Junior
83 Nathan Robinson – Sophomore
84 Alakan Thomas – Sophomore85 Demetrius Holmes – Freshman Tight Ends
17 Steven Veasy – SeniorKickers / Punters
89 Vance Tarver – Freshman99 Derek Williams – Sophomore|width="33"| 
|valign="top"|

Fullbacks
48 Michael Johnson – SophomoreOffensive Line
59 Derrick Dorsey – Senior60 Josh Davis – Freshman61 Brian Lamarr – Freshman62 Jared Brunson – Sophomore68 Thelmore Jackson – Sophomore69 Keith Turner – Freshman70 Demetrius Edwards – Junior71 Lenworth McKenzie – Sophomore73 Cedric Brown – Freshman74 Jonathan Clowers  – Freshman75 Warren Mason – Freshman76 Dan Johnson – Junior77 Donnell Collins – Sophomore78 Terrick Ransom – Freshman 79 Jerome Miller – FreshmanDefensive Line
40 Cordero Campbell – Junior42 Juvaro Goodman – Sophomore50 LaDarien Redfield – Junior57 Johnny Howard – Sophomore86 James Briscoe – Sophomore90 Travis Alston – Sophomore91 Chris Reed – Senior92 Stephen Myers – Freshman 93 Brandon Miller – Senior94 Channing Welch – Junior	
95 Tavarus Butler – Freshman96 Tim Wright – Freshman97 Tametric Hunt – Sophomore|width="33"| 
|valign="top"|

Linebackers
12 Leland Russell – Freshman26 Antwan Allen – Senior32 Anthony Thomas – Freshman35 Sadrak JeanBaptiste – Sophomore43 Jeffrey Robertson – Junior44 Phillip Gaines – Freshman45 J. Vince Cochran – Junior46 Henry Jackson – Sophomore49 Michael Kuku – Sophomore52 Edwin Stevenson – Sophomore53 Nate Clay – Sophomore54 Coy Allen – Freshman55 Xavier Lewis – SophomoreDefensive Backs
3 Cedric Chambers – Freshman7 Darren Hunter –  Junior8 Patrick Thomas – Sophomore10 Justin Cooper – Freshman11 Antonio Martin – Freshman15 Deshawn Printup – Freshman18 CJ Smith – Freshman22 Richie Rucker – Sophomore25 Edward Ndem – Junior27 Mathew Smith – Sophomore28 Jevontae Jefferson – Freshman30 Chris Asbury – Sophomore33 Khelvin Sullivan – Freshman	
37 Toriano Holt – Freshman38 Brent McCall – Sophomore39 Mickolas Dudley – Sophomore41 Emory Williams – Senior72 Michael Mitchell – Freshman|}

Game summaries
LivingstoneHBCU ClassicJustin Babb rushed for 229 yards, including an 81-yard touchdown as the Tigers defeated Division II Livingstone College, 34–12, in the fifth annual HBCU Classic. A crowd of 2,100 fans saw the Tigers take a 25–0 lead in the first half.

The Blue Bears (0–2) had just 28 rushing yards on 26 carries in the game while the Tigers had 391 rushing yards on 49 carries. The Tigers gained 483 yards of offense while the defense sacked the Livingstone quarterback six times. The win gives Savannah State a 7–1 lead in the all-time series against Livingstone.

Alabama StateJoe Turner ClassicSophomore kicker Dereck Williams missed two field goals (36 and 42 yards) late in the fourth quarter as the Alabama State Hornets held on to defeat Savannah State, 20–17, at T.A. Wright Stadium. Quarterback Kurvin Curry completed 13 of 20 passes (159 yards) and Justin Babb rushed for 78 yards on 18 carries. The Tigers lead for much of the game, but fell behind when Devin Dominguez caught a 20-yard pass from Chris Mitchell late in the fourth quarter.

McNeese State

The eighth ranked Cowboys of McNeese State University racked up 489 yards on offense, including a season-high 288 rushing yards, in a 56–0 rout of Savannah State in the first ever meeting between the two schools. The Tigers offense were held to nine first downs during the game and only crossed mid-field three times. The McNeese State defense scored twice including a score on the game's fourth play when the Cowboys' defense sacked SSU quarterback Kurvin Curry and Desmund Lighten recovered his fumble in the end zone. Freshman quarterback A.J. DeFilippis replaced an injured Curry in the first half and completed 9 of 12 passes for 65 yards and one interception in the game. Junior defensive back Edward Ndem led the Tiger's defense with eight tackles while Chris Reed and Jeff Robertson had seven tackles each.

Concordia (AL)

Concordia's Harrison Ellison kicked a 35-yard field goal as time expired to give Concordia a 23–21 win over the Tigers in the 2009 Southern Georgia Heritage Classic in front of 1,333 in attendance. Savannah State led 21–14 with just over nine minutes left in the fourth quarter, but the Hornets, an NAIA-level team, scored nine points in the final five minutes, fourteen seconds to earn the win.

SSU gained 259 yards of total offense compared to Concordia's 376 yards. SSU quarterback A.J. DeFilippis came off the bench and was 9-of-11 passing for 95 yards with two touchdowns, ran five times for 41 yards, and threw an interception. Starting quarterback Kurvin Curry was 5-of-10, passing for 61 yards but was sacked twice. Justin Babb ran for a game-high 74 yards and a touchdown.

Charleston Southern
 Charleston Southern piled up 528 total yards in a 47–10 win over Savannah State. The Tigers only touchdown was a 16-yard run by Justin Babb. Babb finished the game with seven carries for 81 yards. Senior wide receiver Deleon Hollinger surpassed the 100-catch mark in his career in the game. Starting quarterback A.J. Defilippis completed 12 of 28 passes for 124 yards, but threw 2 interceptions. Kurvin Curry completed 4 of 7 passes during the game. The Tigers mustered 266 yards of total offense. The Tigers defense was led by Chris Asbury who achieved a career-high 11 tackles in the game. The Tigers fell to 1–4 on the season and Charleston Southern improved to 2–3.

Bethune–Cookman

The Bethune-Cookman Wildcats stopped Savannah State's Kurvin Curry on fourth-and-goal run from 1-yard line late in the fourth quarter to preserve a 34–24 win. With 4:19 remaining in the game and trailing 27–24, the Tigers went on offense at the Wildcats' 8-yard line when linebacker Michael Kuku forced B-CU quarterback Matthew Johnson to fumble the football and defensive end Chris Reed recovered the ball. The Tigers offense attempted four plays, including two from inside B-CU's 1-yard line, but were unable to score. The Tigers were able to get the ball back at their own 34 yard line with 1:56 remaining in the game, but Curry's pass was intercepted by Michael Williams and returned 52 yards for a touchdown with 42 seconds left. Curry was intercepted again with 40 seconds left in the game by Tavaris Bell on the Tigers final offensive play of the game.

Curry, who relieved starter A.J. Defilippis in the game, was 11 of 23 for 174 yards with one touchdown and two interceptions. Defilippis was 4 of 11 for 49 yards. Savannah State moved to 1–5 and the Wildcats improved to 2–4.

Old Dominion

Savannah State's losing streak was extended to six games after a 38–17 loss to Old Dominion. The loss assures the Tigers of a losing season, the eleventh consecutive, while ODU, who is in their first year of football, improves to 6–2.
Sophomore quarterback Kurvin Curry accounted for 235 of total offense (passed for 185 yards and ran for 50 yards) and two touchdowns. Deleon Hollinger ended the game with 10 receptions for 70 yards. Antwan Allen led the SSU defense with 10 tackles. Late in the third quarter, Derek Williams hit a career-long 46 yard field goal to cut SSU's deficit to 31–10.

ODU quarterback Thomas DeMarco finished the game with 198 yards (14-of-20 passing) and three touchdowns without an interception.

Edward WatersHomecomingThe Tigers ended a 6-game losing streak with a 45–24 Homecoming victory over Edward Waters College at Ted Wright Stadium. The SSU Tigers held a 14–12 lead at halftime and Edward Waters cut the score to 21–18 early in the third quarter, but the SSU eventually pulled away outscoring Edward Waters, 31–12 in the second half. Running back Justin Babb ran 13 times for 167 yards and scored four touchdowns. Babb also caught three passes for a team-high 89 yards. Sophomore quarterback Kurvin Curry was 13-of-26 passing for 234 yards and threw two touchdowns and one interception. He was sacked three times, but ran 21 times for 64 yards, including a 10-yard touchdown.

Savannah State's had 485 total yards of offense while Edward Waters had 358 yards. The loss dropped Edward Waters to 0–9 on the season.

Webber International
 NAIA Webber International finished its season by winning four of its last five games including a 35–20 victory against the Tigers. The Warriors took a 14–10 lead over the Tigers in the second quarter and never trailed again.

The Tigers had 227 yards of total offense in the game. Quarterback Kurvin Curry was 18-of-35 passing for 171 yards and threw two touchdowns, but was intercepted twice. Senior wide receiver Deleon Hollinger had a team-high six catches for 47 yards and one touchdown. Kicker Derek Williams kicked field goals of 42 and 29 yards in the game and made both of his extra-point attempts.

During the game SSU defensive lineman Channing Welch left the game with an injury that required him to be placed on a backboard and taken by ambulance to a hospital.

The loss was the Tigers third to a lower-division team under second-year coach Robby Wells.

North Carolina Central

The Tigers had 173 passing yards and 173 rushing yards, but fell to North Carolina Central 35–14.

The Tigers finished the 2009 football season at 2–8. 

Awards and records

Awards
Senior wide receiver Deleon Hollinger was listed as an honorable mention on the 2009 All-HBCU Football Team presented by Consensus Draft Services.
Kurvin Curry and Derek Williams were named to the Phil Steele College Football Preview'''s 2009 pre-season All-Independent Team. Curry was named as quarterback of the First Team Offense while Williams was named as a punter and placekicker for the First Team Special Team.

Records

Statistics
Current as of  – All Games

Team

Scores by quarter

Individual Offense

Rushing

Passing

Receiving

Defense

Special teams

References

Savannah State
Savannah State Tigers football seasons
Savannah State Tigers football